Donald Moke Takayama (November 16, 1943 – October 22, 2012) was an American professional surfer and surfboard shaper. Originally a longboard surfer, Takayama won the Master's division of the United States Surfing Champions in 1971, 1972 and 1973. Hawaiian born, Takayama learned to surf at Waikiki Beach and moved to California in the mid-1950s. Takayama died of complications from heart surgery; he is survived by his wife and four daughters.

Early life and childhood 
Takayama started surfing during his kindergarten year at Waikiki Beach on the south shore of Oʻahu, Hawaii. At 45 pounds, his 95-pound redwood surfboard was too heavy to carry home. Takayama decided he would have to keep his surfboard at the beach, so he buried it in the sand for safe keeping.

Dale Velzy discovered Takayama while surfing at Mākaha Beach. Velzy noted that none of the young surfers were attending school and told Takayama that if he ever got to the mainland, there would be a job waiting for him. Takayama bought a plane ticket to Los Angeles, at twelve years of age, with money saved from a newspaper delivery route. Takayama worked for Velzy/Jacobs Surfboards and lived in the loft of Dale Velzy's Venice, California surf shop.

Career 

Takayama may have been the world's first professional surfer. "Dale Velzy recalls that Donald's only job was to shape boards and surf at 22nd St. in Hermosa Beach, California... Velzy would give him five dollars and a T shirt with the company logo to go surfing." Takayama started shaping his own surfboards at nine years old and the purpose for the move to the mainland was so that he could establish himself as a surfboard shaper for Velzy/Jacobs Surfboards, "the undisputed leader in retail surfing". Takayama made a move to Jacobs Surfboards when Velzy bought Jacobs out of the partnership; Longboard Magazine named the 1965, Jacob's Donald Takayama model surfboard, "one of the most functional and aesthetically appealing boards ever made." According to Valerie J. Nelson of the Los Angeles Times, "Takayama-designed boards that once sold for as little as $100 have turned into sought-after collectibles that can go for $10,000 today." Takayama designed the David Nuuhiwa Noserider while at Bing surfboards in 1966, before moving on to Weber surfboards, where he and Harold Iggy created the Weber Performer.

Takayama shaped at Surfboards Hawaii in the late 1960s, and founded Hawaiian Pro Designs in the late 1970s in Encinitas, California, Takayama was shaping some shorter surfboards in the 1960s and could be seen riding his 5'10" any day it was breaking at Stone Steps in Encinitas, California, along with 1984 Pipeline Masters champion and Hawaiian Pro Designs' featured surfer Joey Buran.  As the shortboard era progressed, Takayama refocused on longboards, creating the David Nuuhiwa and Dale Dobson models.

Takayama's career was interrupted in 1985. Takayama, along with more than sixty other persons, were charged with conspiracy to possess and distribute cocaine. After serving a little more than a year in Federal prison, Takayama was released in 1987, and resumed his career as a surfboard shaper and manufacturer.

In 1990, Takayama introduced Surfer's Choice, a teriyaki sauce derived from a family recipe. Takayama commented to Los Angeles Times, "Some people dunk doughnuts in it, others put it on their hash browns and eggs. One of my friends can't eat cottage cheese without it, and one guy wrote me saying he even drinks the stuff," Takayama said. Most people use it with fish, poultry and meat dishes either as a sauce or marinade. The Surfer's Choice label featured a graphic of Takayama nose riding a wave.

In the 1990s, longboards made a re-emergence. Now under Takayama's Hawaiian Pro Designs label, and located in North County, San Diego, Takayama along with eight time World Longboard champion, Joel Tudor produced functional and also collectible surfboards.

Among collectable boards was a series of wood alaias designed by Takayama and built by Floridian Brandon Russell in Oceanside, California from 2008 to 2010. Less than 50 of these functional replica surfboards were made, making them particularly sought after by collectors. Nearly half of this collection was shipped to Japan in 2009, and many of the others were built for team riders.

Hawaiian Pro Designs currently has dealers and offices in California, Texas, Hawaii, Europe, Taiwan, Australia  and Canada.

Surfing celebrity

Surfing cinema 

According to Matt Warshaw, author of, The Encyclopedia of Surfing, writes that Takayama was, "...cited as the sport's original, and perhaps greatest, child phenomenon." Warshaw estimates that Takayama was in about a dozen surf movies, some surviving films are, Bruce Brown's, Surf Crazy in 1959, and Barefoot Adventure in 1960, feature appearances continued with On Safari to Stay in 1991 and Thomas Campbell's, The Seedling, in 1999.

Competition

Takayama placed 4th in the 1964 United States Surfing Association's year-end ratings, 3rd in 1965 and 1966, and 5th in 1967.  Competing with the best surfers in the world. Takayama finished runner up to champion, Corky Carroll in the 1966 and 1967 United States Surfboard Championships. Takayama won the Master's division of the United States Surfing Champions in 1971, 1972 and 1973

Honors and acknowledgement 

Takayama was a well regarded waterman, an artist in his craft, and an ambassador to the sport of surfing.

 Takayama was hailed as one of the "25 Surfers Who Changed the Sport" in Surfer Magazine.  
 Takayama was inducted into the International Surfing Hall of Fame in 1991.
 Takayama was honored and inducted into the Surfer's Walk of Fame in July 2007 

Eulogies, with ceremonial paddle-outs were held on November 4, 2012 in Kugenuma, Japan, on November 10, 2012 at Kuhio Beach, Waikiki, Hawaii and at the Junior Seau Pier Amphitheater, in Oceanside, California. Guest speakers attending the Oceanside, California memorial services included, Paul Strauch, Nat Young, Skip Frye, and Joel Tudor.

References

External links 
 Hawaiian Pro Designs
 Donald Takayama Interview, Liquid Salt

American surfers
Surfboard shapers
1943 births
2012 deaths
Sportspeople from Hawaii